Na Afriki is Dobet Gnahoré's second album, released by U.S. based independent label, Cumbancha. It is a contemporary African album with 15 tracks.

Na Afriki "blends upbeat African grooves with delicate ballads." She became a musician after convincing her father that she need not attend an academically focused school; rather, her education should be at home in the artists village, Ki Yi M'Bock. She developed a musical style deeply rooted in the native sounds and traditions of her people.

Much of the album's foundation stems from "a voice (Dobet's) that is full of passion is hard to ignore no matter whether you understand the language that it's singing in or not. Dobet Gnahoré's voice is strong with the power of her belief in herself and the people of Africa. This is not the strident voice of politics, although politics are part of the mix, shouting hate and anger. Nor is it the naïve voice of a child singing about some never-never land of universal love and peace."

Track List

Further reading

Notes

2007 albums